Manuel Arbó (18 July 1898 – 25 May 1973) was a Spanish film actor. He appeared in more than 200 films between 1915 and 1970.

Selected filmography

 Drácula (1931, Spanish version)
 There Were Thirteen (1931, Spanish-language version of Charlie Chan Carries On)
 Juan Simón's Daughter (1935)
 The Man Who Wanted to Kill Himself (1942)
 A Palace for Sale (1942)
 Journey to Nowhere (1942)
 Follow the Legion (1942)
 Idols (1943)
 Bamboo (1945)
 Unknown Path (1946)
The Prodigal Woman (1946)
 The Party Goes On (1948)
 Guest of Darkness (1948)
 The Butterfly That Flew Over the Sea (1948)
 Rumbo (1949)
 The Guitar of Gardel (1949)
 The Captain from Loyola (1949)
 They Always Return at Dawn (1949)
 El último caballo (1950)
 Apollo Theatre (1950)
 The Troublemaker (1950)
 Agustina of Aragon (1950)
 Tales of the Alhambra (1950)
 The Lioness of Castille (1951)
 Captain Poison (1951)
 The Great Galeoto (1951)
 A Tale of Two Villages (1951)
 A Room for Three (1952)
 Airport (1953)
 The Fisher of Songs (1954)
 An Impossible Crime (1954)
 Good News (1954)
 Three are Three (1955)
 Afternoon of the Bulls (1956)
 Sonatas (1959)
 Where Are You Going, Alfonso XII? (1959)
College Boarding House (1959)
 Litri and His Shadow (1960)
 Carnival Day (1960)
 The Little Colonel (1960)
 At Five O'Clock in the Afternoon (1961)
  A Nearly Decent Girl (1963)
 The Troublemaker (1963)
 Aragonese Nobility (1965)
 With the East Wind (1966)

External links

1898 births
1973 deaths
Spanish male film actors
Spanish male silent film actors
Male actors from Madrid
20th-century Spanish male actors